Automotive industry in Vietnam is a fast growing sector, mainly reliant on domestic sales. All currently produced models are designed abroad by foreign brands, and many rely on knock-down kit production. Due to high import taxes on automobiles, the Vietnamese government protects domestic manufacturing. Although Vietnam is a member of the ASEAN Free Trade Area, automobile imports fall under an exception. Since January 1, 2018, the 30% import tax has been discontinued as part of ASEAN agreements. Currently, the Vietnamese motor industry is not deemed competitive enough to make exports feasible. As of April 2018, 85% of car sales in Vietnam were produced domestically from CKD kits.

Before the Đổi Mới, automobile ownership in Vietnam was very limited and the vehicles present were imported from Second World countries that were more politically aligned with the government. In 1995 the first automobile factories were built, using knock-down kits to produce vehicles, starting with Mitsubishi, Toyota and Isuzu. Between 2003 and 2006, automobile sales tax was increased from 5% to 50%, thus slowing down car sales.

The Vietnamese car market is relatively small, but the fastest growing in Southeast Asia.

Most automobile manufacturers in Vietnam are a member of the (non-governmental) Vietnam Automobile Manufacturers' Association (VAMA).

Auto parts
Vietnam has a US$900 million trade surplus in car parts, totaling US$4.4 billion of car part exports. Most of this production is by foreign owned businesses operating in Vietnam. In total the number of parts suppliers was 226 in 2018. In 2018, the share of locally produced parts in the Vietnamese automotive industry was just 10%, compared to up to 80% in Thailand and Indonesia. Due to most advanced parts having to be imported, locally produced vehicles are generally more expensive than foreign built vehicles.

Foreign brands

Chevrolet

GM owned a CKD-kit assembly plant in Hanoi, but the plant was sold to Vinfast in 2018.

Daihatsu
Daihatsu subsidiary Vindaco produced the Terios from CKDs in Vietnam. The company was dissolved after four years after sales proved too low.

Fiat

Mekong Auto Corporation was founded in 1991.

Ford

Ford Vietnam is a joint venture between Ford Motor Company (75%) and Song Cong Diesel Company (25%), with assembly taking place in Hải Dương province in the north of Vietnam.

Hino
Hino trucks are built in Vietnam in a joint venture with Vinamotor. Hino has been present in Vietnam since 1996.

Honda

Honda Vietnam is a joint venture of Honda and the Vietnam Engine and Agricultural Machinery Corporation (VEAM). It is the top selling motorcycle brand in Vietnam, and operates three motorcycle factories and one car factory in Vietnam.

Hyundai

Hyundai models are manufactured from CKD kits by Hyundai Thanh Cong Auto, a joint venture between Hyundai and Vietnam's Thanh Cong Auto. Hyundai reportedly strongly considered building a manufacturing plant in Ninh Binh, to produce the Grand i10 model.

Kia

Since 2008, Kia Motors vehicles are produced from CKD kits by THACO Kia, a joint venture with THACO, at a plant in Chu Lai. Models produced are the Kia New Morning, Kia Forte, Kia Sorento, Kia Carens, Kia Cerato, Kia Optima.

Mazda
Through its joint venture with THACO, Vina Mazda Automobile Manufacturing, Mazda 2 models are produced at a plant in Nui Thanh. The plant has a production capacity of 10,000 vehicles per year and employs 300 workers.

Mitsubishi

Mitsubishi Motors is active in Vietnam through its Vina Star Motors Corporation joint venture with Malaysian PROTON Holdings. In 1997 production of Mitsubishi vehicles was started with the Mitsubishi Delica van, with other vehicles being the Mitsubishi Pajero and Mitsubishi Canter.

SsangYong

Suzuki
Suzuki builds cars in Vietnam through its Visuco subsidiary, operating in a factory in Bien Hoa, Dong Nai Province. The factory produces the Super Carry, Ertiga, Grand Vitara, Vitara and Swift, as well as the Impulse 125 Fi, Hayate 125, UA125-T, Viva 115 Fi, Raider 150 and Axelo 125 motorbikes. Annual production is 6000 motor vehicles and 100,000 motorbikes.

Toyota

Toyota Motor Vietnam uses CKD kits to produce vehicles for the domestic market. Vehicles produced are the Vios, Fortuner and Innova. It produced 41,000 vehicles in 2017.

Mercedes-Benz
Daimler AG assembles various Mercedes-Benz models from CKD kits at its factory in Ho Chi Minh City. The first car assembled by Mercedes-Benz Vietnam was an E-Class in 1996. The factory is a joint venture with Sai Gon Mechanical Engineering Corporation. In 2017, the factory built 6,000 vehicles.

Peugeot
Peugeot opened a factory in 2019 at Quang Nam province to produce the Peugeot 3008 and Peugeot 5008 for domestic market through joint venture with THACO. Since 2020, the Peugeot 2008 is also assembled locally at THACO Chu Lai plant.

Licensed production
SAMCO produces Hyundai buses under licence.

Domestic brands

Vinfast

VinFast is the only domestic passenger vehicle brand in Vietnam. In August 2018, General Motors sold its Vietnamese operations to Vinfast, granting the latter distribution rights of GM models in Vietnam, and transferring its Hanoi plant to Vinfast. Vinfast will use the plant to produce its own developed vehicles, in addition to the already planned plant in Haiphong. The CEO of Vinfast is former GM executive Jim DeLuca. VinFast also produce ICE cars, electric cars and electric scooters.

Former domestic brands

Vinaxuki

Vinaxuki produced light commercial vehicles. There were also plans for a small car which would have been Vietnam's first domestically developed passenger car, but the company went bankrupt and ceased operations in 2015. All efforts to revive the company and restart production have so far been unsuccessful.

La Dalat

La Dalat was a Citroen 2CV based car designed by French Citroen engineers based in Vietnam. 5,000 vehicles were produced between 1969 and 1975, making it the first car produced in Vietnam.

Sales
In 2017, Toyota held the highest market share among passenger vehicle sales in Vietnam, at 23%.

Since 2013, the Toyota Vios is the bestselling car in Vietnam, followed by the Hyundai Accent and Hyundai Grand i10.

 Data from VAMA members only.

See also
Transport in Vietnam
Automotive industry
Automotive industry by country
Motorcycle industry in Vietnam
List of Asian automobile manufacturers
List of countries by motor vehicle production

References

External links 

 

 
Industry in Vietnam